Alexander-von-Humboldt-Schule or Alexander-von-Humboldt-Gymnasium is the name of the following schools, named after Alexander von Humboldt:

Germany
 Alexander-von-Humboldt-Schule Aßlar (Gesamtschule)
 Alexander-von-Humboldt-Realschule Bayreuth
 Alexander-von-Humboldt-Gymnasium Berlin
 Alexander-von-Humboldt-Gymnasium Bornheim
 Alexander-von-Humboldt-Gymnasium Bremen
 Alexander-von-Humboldt-Gymnasium Chemnitz
 Gymnasium Alexander von Humboldt Eberswalde
 Alexander-von-Humboldt Schule Eschwege (Grundschule)
 Alexander-von-Humboldt-Schule Gießen (Haupt- und Realschule)
 Alexander-von-Humboldt-Schule Goldkronach (Grundschule)
 Alexander-von-Humboldt-Gymnasium Greifswald
 Alexander-von-Humboldt-Gymnasium (Hamburg)
 Alexander-von-Humboldt-Gymnasium, Konstanz, Baden-Württemberg
 Humboldt-Gymnasium, Köln
 Alexander-von-Humboldt-Schule Lauterbach (Gymnasium)
 Humboldt-Gymnasium Leipzig (nur nach Alexander von Humboldt benannt)
 Alexander-von-Humboldt-Mittelschule Marktredwitz
 Alexander-von-Humboldt-Schule Neumünster (Gymnasium)
 Alexander-von-Humboldt-Gymnasium, Neuss, North Rhine-Westphalia
 Alexander-von-Humboldt-Schule Rüsselsheim (Gesamtschule)
 Alexander-von-Humboldt-Gymnasium, Schweinfurt, Bavaria
 Alexander-von-Humboldt-Schule Viernheim (Gymnasium)
 Gymnasium Alexander von Humboldt Werdau
 Alexander-von-Humboldt-Schule Wittmund

Elsewhere
 Colegio Alemán Alexander von Humboldt (Mexico City)
 Alexander von Humboldt German International School Montreal
 Colegio Humboldt, Caracas, Venezuela
 Instituto Alexander Von Humboldt, Barranquilla, Colombia

Alexander von Humboldt